Liam Walsh (born 18 May 1986) is a British professional boxer. He challenged once for the IBF super-featherweight title in 2017. He held the Commonwealth super-featherweight title from 2010 to 2017, and the British super-featherweight title from 2014 to 2016. Liam has two brothers, both of whom are also professional boxers, most notably his twin Ryan Walsh.

Professional career

Early career 
Walsh made his professional boxing debut on 2 February 2008 alongside his twin brother, Ryan, and their elder brother, Michael. Boxing on the same bill as Olympic silver medalist Amir Khan at London's Excel Arena, all three brothers scored winning debuts.

Liam Walsh faced journeyman Daniel Thorpe and made a quick start with a first round win. Speaking of his debut victory Walsh said "I knocked him down but he got back up. I caught him with a good right hand and I don't think he fancied the job after that." Walsh followed up the victory with further wins in 2008 over journeymen Johnny Greaves and Youssef Al Hamidi.  In 2009 Walsh defeated Shaun Walton, Baz Carey and Jon Baguley. In 2010 Walsh expanded his record to 9 wins against no defeats with victories over Sid Razak, Ibrar Riyaz and the Frenchman Sebastien Cornu.

Commonwealth super-featherweight champion
On 23 October 2010 Walsh headlined a bill for the first time at the York Hall in Bethnal Green. The occasion was a challenge for the Commonwealth super-featherweight title recently vacated by Scotsman Ricky Burns.  Walsh defeated his co-challenger for the belt, the Ghanaian Maxwell Awuku who had had a record of 20 wins and one defeat before that fight, over the full 12 rounds in a grueling contest. Prior to the victory, brothers Michael and Ryan had also scored wins on the bill defeating Ian Bailey and James Ancliff respectively.  On 20 March 2010 Walsh made his first successful defence of the title, traveling to Wigan to beat local man John Kays with a stoppage in the 9th round.  The second defence of his title came on 30 September 2011 with Walsh meeting former British champion Paul Appleby in a thrilling fight at the York Hall.  Despite winning in the tenth round Walsh had been knocked down and hurt in the seventh round and said afterwards that it was "definitely the hardest fight I've been in."

Walsh was scheduled to fight in his first World title fight against WBO Lightweight Champion Ricky Burns on 15 December 2012 but had to withdraw from the fight due to injuries from being involved in a car crash.

British super-featherweight champion
Liam Walsh won the British super-featherweight title in a highly contested fight against Gary Sykes. Walsh dropped Sykes in the first round and went on to dominate the fight and won a clear decision with judges scores of 119–108, 118–111 and 118–109.

Liam Walsh defended his titles on 28 February in a rematch against Joe Murray who he previously beat by Majority Decision, this time winning by 5th round TKO.

On 8 October 2016 Walsh battled undefeated Russian Andrey Kimov as a final IBF eliminator for their version of the super featherweight title. Walsh switched his stance effortlessly throughout the fight and was moving well. In a well-rounded, dominant win, Walsh managed to get the nod via unanimous decision.

In his next fight, Walsh challenged Gervonta Davis for his IBF super-featherweight title. Davis started off with a sharp jab and controlled most of the action in the opening round. The second round was closer, but Davis still had the edge. In the third round, Davis managed to catch Walsh with a big shot, which wobbled the latter, opening the way for Davis so finish the fight with a flurry of big shots. Walsh got dropped, and despite beating the count, was not able to recover and another barrage of shots from Davis forced the referee to stop the fight.

On 9 November 2019 Walsh battled Maxi Hughes for the vacant WBO European lightweight title. Walsh outboxed Hughes to a unanimous decision, 98-92, 97-93 and 96-94 on the scorecards.

Professional boxing record

References

External links

Liam Walsh profile at Frank Warren Promotions
Liam Walsh profile at BoxNation
Liam Walsh - Profile, News Archive & Current Rankings at Box.Live

English male boxers
English people of Irish descent
Sportspeople from Rochdale
1986 births
Living people
People from Cromer
Commonwealth Boxing Council champions
Super-featherweight boxers
Lightweight boxers
Southpaw boxers
British Boxing Board of Control champions